A Tribute to Led Zeppelin is a cover album and the tenth solo studio album by American singer-songwriter Beth Hart, released on February 25, 2022, through Provogue Records and Mascot Label Group. It was produced by Rob Cavallo and features string arrangements from David Campbell. The album debuted at number one in the UK (Rock & Metal Albums) and in the  Netherlands (Album Top 100).

Critical reception
Reviewing the album for Classic Rock, John Aizlewood called Hart "more qualified than most to have a go" at a Led Zeppelin tribute album, writing that her "grizzled but technically proficient voice carries more than a hint of Robert Plant's, especially on her rampage through 'Whole Lotta Love'". Awarding the album three-and-a-half stars out of five, he concluded that while it is an "exhilarating labour of love", it does not offer "anything new" to the "rock perfection" of the original songs.

Track listing

Charts

References

2022 albums
Albums produced by Rob Cavallo
Beth Hart albums
Mascot Label Group albums
Led Zeppelin tribute albums